Manpower is an album by Miquel Brown, recorded in 1983. It includes the major international hits "So Many Men, So Little Time" and "He's a Saint, He's a Sinner"  which peaked at number two and number twenty-nine respectively on the US dance charts, as well as the moderate hits "Beeline" and "Sunny Day."

Track listing 
All tracks composed by Ian Levine and Fiachra Trench; arranged by Fiachra Trench
 "Man Power" - 8:00
 "Beeline" - 9:34
 "Sunny Day" - 4:39
 "He's a Saint, He's a Sinner" - 8:33
 "Maybe He Forgot" - 4:41
 "So Many Men, So Little Time - 8:12

Personnel
Miquel Brown - vocals
Fiachra Trench, Nick Glennie-Smith - synthesizer and Linn drum programming
Fiachra Trench - keyboards, co-producer
Andy Peak - bass on "Sunny Day" and "Maybe He Forgot"
Luís Jardim - timpani on "Manpower"
Jeff Daly, Malcolm Griffiths, Martin Drover - horns on ""Sunny Day"
Miquel Brown, Marilyn David, Ruby James, Sylvia Mason-James,  Earlene Bentley, Yvonne Gidden, Miss Piggy, Fiachra Trench, Sarah McMahon, Wavelength, The Trotters

References 

1983 albums
Miquel Brown albums
albums recorded at Trident Studios